Hero Wars may refer to:

 HeroQuest (role-playing game), a 2000 role-playing game first published as Hero Wars.
 Hero Wars (mobile game), a 2016 video game released by Nexters